Gatab District is a district (bakhsh) in Babol County, Mazandaran Province, Iran. At the 2006 census, its population was 45,104, in 11,185 families.  The District has one city: Gatab.  The District has two rural districts (dehestan): Gatab-e Jonubi Rural District and Gatab-e Shomali Rural District.

References 

Babol County
Districts of Mazandaran Province